The Locus Award for Best First Novel is one of the annual Locus Awards  presented by the science fiction and fantasy magazine Locus. Awards presented in a given year are for works published in the previous calendar year. The award for Best First Novel was first presented in 1981. The Locus Awards have been described as a prestigious prize in science fiction, fantasy and horror literature.

Winners

See also
Locus Award

References

External links
https://web.archive.org/web/20081201034720/http://www.locusmag.com/SFAwards/Db/LocusWinsByCategory.html
http://www.locusmag.com/News/2011/06/locus-awards-2011-winners

Lists of award winners
Speculative fiction awards
American literary awards
First book awards
1981 establishments in the United States
Awards established in 1981
First Novel
Debut speculative fiction novels